Malik Shakir Bashir Awan (born 29 October 1965) is a Pakistani politician who had been a member of the National Assembly of Pakistan, from 2008 to May 2018....

Early life

He was born on 29 October 1965.

Political career
He was elected to the National Assembly of Pakistan as a candidate of Pakistan Muslim League (N) (PML-N) from Constituency NA-70 (Khushab-II) in 2008 Pakistani general election. He received 66,361 votes and defeated an independent candidate, Malik Muhammad Ehsan Ullah Tiwana.

He was re-elected to the National Assembly as a candidate of PML-N from Constituency NA-70 (Khushab-II) in 2013 Pakistani general election. He received 94,594 votes and defeated an independent candidate, Sardar Shujja Muhammad Khan.

References

Living people
Pakistan Muslim League (N) politicians
Punjabi people
Pakistani MNAs 2013–2018
1965 births
Pakistani MNAs 2008–2013